Kevin Costner & Modern West is an American country rock band founded and fronted by actor Kevin Costner. He began a worldwide tour with the band in October 2007, which included shows in Istanbul and Rome. It also performed at NASCAR Sprint Cup Series races at Daytona International Speedway and Lowe's Motor Speedway in Concord, North Carolina.

The band released its first country album, Untold Truths, on November 11, 2008, on Universal South Records. It peaked at No. 61 on the Billboard Top Country Albums chart and No. 35 on the Top Heatseekers chart. Three singles ("Superman 14", "Long Hot Night" and "Backyard") have been released to radio, although none have charted. Videos were made for the songs "Superman 14", "Backyard" and "Hey Man What About You".

In 2009, Costner went on tour with the band and special guests The Alternate Routes. In August, at the Big Valley Jamboree in Camrose, Alberta, Costner and the band were scheduled next on stage when a severe thunderstorm struck, causing the stage and stands on the main stage to collapse. One person was reported dead and forty wounded. Later, an auction was held to raise money for the two young sons of the woman killed. A dinner with Costner was auctioned for $41,000. Two guitars, one autographed by Costner, helped raise another $10,000 each.

In February 2010, Kevin Costner & Modern West released their second album, Turn It On, only in Europe. To support the album the band toured Europe, with Turn It On reaching the album charts in Germany, Austria, Switzerland and Greece. The first single from the album, "Let Me Be the One", with special guest Sara Beck singing with Costner, was also made as a music video. A third album, From Where I Stand, was released in 2011 and included vocals from the German pop singer Nena. In April 2012, the band played a benefit gala for the Adrienne Arsht Center for the Performing Arts in Miami, Florida.

Discography

Studio albums

Singles

Music videos

References

External links

 Review of Kevin's Country Band at www.CountryMusicpride.com

Musical groups established in 2007
Show Dog-Universal Music artists
American country rock groups
American country music groups